Wedding is an 18-episode South Korean television drama that aired on KBS2 in 2005. The series explores the relationship of a newly wed couple, showing how two people, who met and married through an arranged matchmaking, slowly develop a relationship and learn what it means to be married. Some of the issues explored include what is the most important thing in a marriage, trust and honesty between a couple, how past relationships affect present, and the role of family in a relationship. Unlike other dramas written by Oh Soo-yeon, which focused on people falling in love by fate or destiny, this one is about two people with very different personalities, values, and backgrounds, and seeing how they learn to love one another despite all of their differences.

Plot
Lee Se-na (Jang Nara) is a single child raised in a wealthy family and pampered by her protective parents.  She has never been hurt and naively believes that love can overcome all obstacles.  Although she has a big heart, she is selfish, not trusting, and cares mostly only about her own feelings.  One day, she meets Han Seung-woo (Ryu Si-won) through an arranged date and instantly falls in love with him.  Seung-woo is from a poor family and likes a simple and frugal life.  Although he is very honest and righteous, he has difficulty sensing other people's feelings and expressing his own.  After a short period of time, Se-na and Seung-woo decide to get married, before they have truly gotten to know one another.  We also meet Shin Yoon-soo (Myung Se-bin) and Seo Jin-hee (Lee Hyun-woo), both childhood friends of Seung-woo and each with their strengths, shortcomings, and past relationships with the main duo.  As they learn more about one another and what it means to be married, Se-na and Seung-woo soon begin to argue and fight due to their differences, past relationships, mistrust, and their insecurities about the relationship.  Their relationship deteriorates to the brink of divorce, not knowing whether they can overcome the obstacles that face them.

Cast
 Jang Na-ra as Lee Se-na
 Kim Bo-ra as young Lee Se-na
 Ryu Si-won as Han Seung-woo 
 Myung Se-bin as Shin Yoon-soo
 Lee Hyun-woo as Seo Jin-hee
 Choi Woo-je as Jung-min
 Tomoaki Okabe as Louie
 Gong Hyun-joo as Oh Soo-ji
 Kim Min-joo as Cha Eun-hee
 Kang Seok-woo as Lee Jung-il
 Na Young-hee as Sung Hae-rim
 Jung Young-sook as Jung Sook-hee
 Lee Sae-min as Se-na's brother who's studying abroad
 Han Seung-joo as Seung-woo's brother
 Song Chang-eui as Yoon Hyung-chul
 Lee Young-ah
 Lee Hye-sook
 Min Ji-ah

References

External links
 Wedding official KBS website 
 

Korean-language television shows
2005 South Korean television series debuts
2005 South Korean television series endings
Korean Broadcasting System television dramas
South Korean romance television series